Ents are a fictional race of tree shepherds in The Lord of the Rings fantasy novels.

Ent or ENT may also refer to:

Arts and entertainment 
 Ent (comics), a Marvel comics character
 Extreme Noise Terror, a British grindcore band
 Star Trek: Enterprise, a science fiction television series

People 
 Bas Ent (born 1987), Dutch footballer
 George Ent (1604–1689), English scientist who studied anatomy
 Uzal Girard Ent (1900–1948), U.S. Air Force major general

Science and medicine 
 Equilibrative nucleoside transporter, a protein
 Otorhinolaryngology, treating the ear, nose and throat
 Ent-, a prefix meaning the opposite enantiomer of a chemical

Technology 
 Electronic notetaking
 Enfilade (Xanadu), a data structure in the hypertext project, Xanadu
 Rossignol ENT, an automatic rifle
 Electrical nonmetallic tubing; a type of electrical conduit

Transport 
 Ent Air Force Base, in Colorado Springs; defunct
 Enewetak Auxiliary Airfield, Enewetak Atoll, Marshall Islands

Other uses 
 Ent Credit Union, an American credit union
 ENT Ltd., a defunct Australian media company
 Ent?, Trinidadian and Tobagonian slang for "is that not so?" or "That's true, isn't it?"